The City of Auckland by-election was a by-election in the New Zealand electorate of City of Auckland, an urban seat in the Auckland region, in the upper North Island.

Summary
The by-election was held on 27 April 1900, and was precipitated by the death of sitting MP William Crowther. The seat was won by Liberal candidate Joseph Witheford who defeated four other candidates including Prime Minister Richard Seddon's personally endorsed candidate, the former Mayor of Auckland James Job Holland.

Table of results

References

Notes

Auckland 1900
1900 elections in New Zealand
By-election 1900
Politics of the Auckland Region
1900s in Auckland